How Doooo You Do!!! is a 1945 American comedy film directed by Ralph Murphy and written by Harry Sauber and Joseph Carole. The film stars Bert Gordon, Harry von Zell, Cheryl Walker, Ella Mae Morse, Frank Albertson and Claire Windsor. The film was released on December 24, 1945, by Producers Releasing Corporation.

Murder occurs when several of the most popular radio personalities of the '40s converge on a desert resort.

Cast     
Bert Gordon as himself
Harry von Zell as himself
Cheryl Walker as herself
Ella Mae Morse as herself
Frank Albertson as Tom Brandon
Claire Windsor as herself
Charles Middleton as Sheriff Hayworth
Matt McHugh as Deputy McNiel
Francis Pierlot as Proprietor
Sidney Marion as Dr. Kolmar
Keye Luke as himself
Thomas E. Jackson as himself
James Burke as himself
Fred Kelsey as himself
Leslie Denison as himself
Eddie Kane as himself
Harlow Wilcox as himself

References

External links
 

1945 films
American comedy films
1945 comedy films
Producers Releasing Corporation films
Films directed by Ralph Murphy
American black-and-white films
1940s English-language films
1940s American films